Skinz may refer to:

Skinz, Danish singer of Somali descent
Dave Skinz,  DJ, Producer, Music Journalist, DJ Store Owner, Promoter 
"Skinz", song by Pete Rock & CL Smooth from their 1992 debut album Mecca and the Soul Brother

See also
Skin (disambiguation)